Option nationale, registered as Option nationale – Pour l'indépendance du Québec (National Option – For the Independence of Quebec), was a centre-left and left-wing nationalist political party in Quebec, Canada. It advocated for the sovereignty of Quebec from Canada, and said a vote for Option nationale is an electoral mandate for full-fledged autonomy (de facto sovereignty), before holding a referendum to adopt the constitution of Quebec as an independent state (de jure sovereignty). It merged with Québec solidaire on January 1, 2018 to become a collective within the party.

History 
It was founded in 2011 by Jean-Martin Aussant, a member of the National Assembly (MNA) who had quit the Parti Québécois (PQ) earlier that year after being elected in 2008.

The party had planned to use the name "Option Québec", as a nod to René Lévesque's 1968 manifesto An Option for Quebec, but it was already taken by another group.

In August 2011, before the party was founded, Aussant was courted by the Parti Indépendantiste, with leader Eric Tremblay hoping to have his first member of the National Assembly. Aussant refused however, saying he disagreed with the party's position on reducing immigration, and with the view of the party that the 1995 referendum was lost because of "anglophone and ethnic votes". Aussant insists that economic fears propagated by federalists were responsible for the referendum defeat.

Shortly after the creation of Option nationale, Lisette Lapointe, wife of former Quebec Premier Jacques Parizeau, acquired a membership card from the party, but decided to continue sitting as an independent until the end of her term, and did not run for reelection in the 2012 provincial election.

During the campaign of the 2012 general election, columnist Dan Delmar of the National Post commented:

On June 19, 2013, Jean-Martin Aussant resigned as leader of Option nationale, and Nathaly Dufour became interim leader. On October 26, 2013, Sol Zanetti became the new leader of Option nationale.

It merged with Québec solidaire on January 1, 2018 to become a collective within the party.

Election results

References

External links 
 Option nationale website (French only)

2011 establishments in Quebec
2018 disestablishments in Quebec
Left-wing nationalist parties
Organizations based in Longueuil
Pro-independence parties
Quebec sovereignty movement
Quebec nationalism
Political parties established in 2011
Political parties disestablished in 2018
Provincial political parties in Quebec
Secessionist organizations in Canada
Republicanism in Canada
Social democratic parties in Canada